Duncan Dares was a BBC Television children's programme that was first broadcast between 24 April 1985 and 2 June 1987.

The series was presented by Peter Duncan who had been a presenter on Blue Peter in the early 1980s. Each episode had an adventure-based outdoor theme in keeping with Duncan's reputation on Blue Peter as a man of action.

Episodes

Series 1

Episodes 1-5 were repeated on BBC1 on Thursdays from 26 June to 24 July 1986. Episode 6 was repeated on BBC2 on Thursday 31 July 1986.

Series 2

Series produced by Rob Benfield.

Series repeated on BBC1 on Mondays from 17 July to 21 August 1989.

1980s British children's television series
1985 British television series debuts
1987 British television series endings